St. Albans Police Department is the primary law enforcement agency providing police services to St. Albans City and Highgate, Vermont.

External links
 http://www.stalbanspd.com

St. Albans, Vermont